Catisfield is an area of Fareham, Hampshire, England. Originally a small village in its own right, it has now merged with the western edge of the town.

Hamlet
Originally a hamlet, Catisfield is first mentioned in the Pipe Roll of the Bishopric of Winchester in 1210 and mentioned in 1279 in the tithing of North Fareham, when Catisfield, Dean, Pokesole, Cams and Bedenham had been added to the Hundred of
Fareham.

The location of Catisfield is to the north of Titchfield village on the eastern edge of the Meon Valley. There is little documented history relating to Catisfield; amongst the records that are available there is mention of it as a small hamlet sited on the crest of Titchfield Hill at a road junction overlooking the Meon Valley. Before the 19th century Catisfield was at the junction of historic routes to Botley, Stubbington, Titchfield, Southampton, Fareham and Portsmouth. It is said that Samuel Pepys probably rode through it on his travels as did Margaret of Anjou on her way to Titchfield Abbey at the bottom of Fishers Hill from Southwick in 1445, for the reconfirmation of her marriage in France to Henry VI.

The hamlet does still feature the original, but no longer used, post office and some preserved Georgian and Victorian buildings.

It is also very close to Titchfield Abbey and the River Meon, which lie just down Fishers Hill.

References

External links

Fareham
Villages in Hampshire